Edward Patrick Berrang (October 14, 1922 – July 3, 1992) was an American football defensive end in the National Football League for the Washington Redskins, the Detroit Lions and the Green Bay Packers.  He played college football at Villanova University and was drafted in the fifth round of the 1949 NFL Draft.

1922 births
1992 deaths
People from Schuylkill County, Pennsylvania
Players of American football from Pennsylvania
American football defensive ends
Villanova Wildcats football players
Washington Redskins players
Detroit Lions players
Green Bay Packers players